Kálmán Mészöly (16 July 1941 – 21 November 2022) was a Hungarian professional football player and coach. He played his entire career at Vasas SC, where he operated as a centre-back. His nickname was "The Blond Rock". 

Mészöly played a total of 61 matches and scored six goals for the Hungary national team. He participated in the 1962 FIFA World Cup, the 1964 European Championship, and the 1966 FIFA World Cup. His team, Vasas, was Hungarian champions with his participation in 1961, 1962, 1965 and 1966. He also was part of Hungary's squad for the 1960 Summer Olympics, but he did not play in any matches.

Mészöly played in several World All-Stars games during the 1960s and 1970s. He later had three spells as head coach of the Hungary national football team: 1980–83, 1990–91 and 1994–95. He led Hungary to the 1982 FIFA World Cup.

Mészöly died on 21 November 2022, at the age of 81. His son, Géza Mészöly (born in 1967), is also a former football player and coach.

References

1941 births
2022 deaths
Footballers from Budapest
Hungarian footballers
Hungary international footballers
Hungarian football managers
Hungarian expatriate football managers
Hungary national football team managers
Olympic bronze medalists for Hungary
Olympic medalists in football
Olympic footballers of Hungary
Footballers at the 1960 Summer Olympics
1962 FIFA World Cup players
1964 European Nations' Cup players
1966 FIFA World Cup players
Vasas SC players
1982 FIFA World Cup managers
Fenerbahçe football managers
Turkey national football team managers
Vasas SC managers
Békéscsaba 1912 Előre managers
Expatriate football managers in Turkey
Altay S.K. managers
Ittihad FC managers
Expatriate football managers in Saudi Arabia
Association football defenders
Zalaegerszegi TE managers
Medalists at the 1960 Summer Olympics
Nemzeti Bajnokság I managers